La Plaine-des-Palmistes is a commune in the French overseas department of Réunion.

Geography
It lies in the eastern part of the island, on the RN3 road, south west of Saint-Benoît and northeast of the Col de Bellevue.  It is known for its nearby forest and for the Biberon Falls. It lies close to the slopes of the Piton des Songes.

The communal territory is entirely located in the tops of the island. It borders Saint-Benoît, Sainte-Rose and Le Tampon.

Climate

La Plaine-des-Palmistes has a oceanic climate (Köppen climate classification Cfa).

Population

See also
Communes of the Réunion department

References

External links
La Plaine-des-Palmistes at runweb.com 

Communes of Réunion